Benjamin Josses Odoki (born 23 March 1943) was the tenth Chief Justice of Uganda from 2001 to 2013.

Background and education
He was born in Dhaka Village, Busia District, in the Eastern Region of Uganda, on 23 March 1943, in a family with modest means. He studied at King's College, Budo, in Wakiso District, for his secondary school education. He was admitted to the University College, Dar es Salaam, in Tanzania, where he graduated with a Bachelor of Laws degree in 1969. Later, he received a Diploma in Legal Practice, from the Law Development Centre in Kampala. In 1974, he achieved a Certificate in Development Studies from the University of Sussex,  a Certificate in International Law from Geneva in 1975 and a Doctor of Law (LL.D) Degree (Honoris Causa) from the Commonwealth University Belize in London.

Career before judgeship
He returned to Uganda after his studies in Tanzania. In 1969 he became an Advocate of the High Court of Uganda and was called to the Uganda Bar. The following year, he was appointed a State Attorney and was later promoted to Senior State Attorney a few years later. He also served as Director of the Uganda Law Development Centre.

Career as a judge
In 1978, at the age of 35 years, he was appointed as a judge to the High Court of Uganda. From 1981 until 1984 was seconded to serve as the Director of Public Prosecutions. In 1986 he was appointed as a Justice of the Supreme Court of Uganda. From 1996 to 2000, he served as Chairman of the Judicial Service Commission. He became the Chief Justice of Uganda in 2001, serving in that capacity until his mandatory retirement at the age of 70 on 23 March 23, 2013. He did however serve a three months extension until 23 June 2013 however the extension was controversial and generated mixed reactions from the public. He is currently serves as a Vice president/ Judge of the Administrative Tribunal of the African Development Bank and Judge of the Supreme Court of Swaziland.

Family
He is married with to Veronica Odoki, and is the father of four adult; Peter Odoki, Phillip Odoki, Dorah Odoki and Joshua Odoki.

Other considerations
He at one time taught at Makerere University Faculty of Law and at the Law Development Centre. He served as the chairperson of the Editorial Board of the Uganda Law Reports. He has written a number of books and has published articles on a number of subjects, including constitutional development, human rights and criminal justice.

Awards
In 2012 he received the Gusi Peace Prize International Award in Manila at the Philippine International Convention Centre for Social Justice and Humaritarian Law.
He also has the Distinguished Jurist Award by the Nigerian Association of Democratic Lawyers.

See also
Government of Uganda
Supreme Court of Uganda

References

External links
The Judiciary of Uganda Homepage
Uganda Online Law Library - Courts and Judicature
Uganda Online Law Library - Supreme Court of Uganda Rules - 76 pp pdf
Uganda Legal Information Institute
Uganda Legal Society
East African Law Society

1943 births
Living people
20th-century Ugandan judges
People from Eastern Region, Uganda
Chief justices of Uganda
Law Development Centre alumni
People from Busia District, Uganda
University of Dar es Salaam alumni
21st-century Ugandan judges
Academic staff of Makerere University
Academic staff of the Law Development Centre